Volt Germany (mostly known by the abbreviated name Volt) is a social-liberal pro-European, eurofederalist political party in Germany. It is the German branch of Volt Europa, a political movement that operates on a European level.

Italian Andrea Venzon, French Colombe Cahen-Salvador and German Damian Boeselager founded Volt Europa in 2017 as a counterpart to the rising nationalism and right-wing populism in Europe.

The party has been classified as socially liberal and pro-European. The key topics are: A reform of the European Union, tackling the climate crisis, a fair and sustainable economy, and digitalization. Volt has an evidence-based, scientific approach and is highly interested in introducing best practices.

As there is no legal possibility to found a (pan-)European party, after the founding of the parent organisation Volt Europa A.I.S.B.L., national parties had to be founded to be able to participate in elections. On March 3, 2018, Volt Germany was founded as a party in Hamburg. Volt Germany's first elections were the 2019 European elections and they were able to win one mandate, which Damian Boeselager holds in the European Parliament. At the municipal level, Volt Germany is part of the city governments of Munich, Cologne,  Frankfurt am Main, and Wiesbaden among others.

The party's name is derived from the international electrical unit Volt in order to have a uniform name that is understandable throughout Europe, symbolizing "new energy" for Europe.

Policies

Programmatic development 
After its foundation, the "5+1 Challenges" were adopted for the parent organization Volt Europa. Soon afterwards, the European basic programme Mapping of Policies was adopted, which serves as the basis for the creation of all Volt programmes. Volt Europa finally stood for the European elections in 2019 with the election programme derived from the European policy programme, the Amsterdam Declaration. Since then, the Mapping of Policies has been accompanied by several thematic documents. Together with the Mapping of Policies, these documents form the so-called Policy Portfolio, from which all national, regional and local programmes are derived.

On  December 22, 2020, Volt Germany presented the basic policy programme adapted to Germany on the basis of the Mapping of Policies and later developed the election programme for the 2021 Bundestag elections from it.

Programme

European policy 
Volt sees the European Union (EU) as the most successful intergovernmental project since the Second World War, enabling Europe's citizens to live in peace, freedom and prosperity. At the same time, Volt believes that the often outdated, entrenched political structures of the EU are increasingly reaching their limits when facing current and future challenges. Volt is convinced that these challenges cannot be met effectively by addressing them alone at and at a national level, but only with stronger integration and more European democracy.

In Volt's view, the reform of the European Union must begin with the reform of its bodies and institutions. Volt calls for an EU of and by its citizens with reformed electoral law and more participation, in which the directly elected parliament and not individual heads of state and government decide the common future. Volt's goal is a European federal republic that should be able to meet current challenges - from climate change to mobility transformation and digitalisation, to social inequality. This also includes a common European army, instead of many national ones.

Climate policy 
Volt aims at making Germany CO₂-neutral by 2035 and climate-neutral by 2040. The party's strategy consists of an holistic approach, they describe as a social-liberal transformation. For Volt, climate policy is a cross-cutting issue. It is important to the party that climate policy is designed in a socially compatible way and that the economy is set up in an economically as well as ecologically sustainable way. In order to achieve the goal of comprehensive decarbonisation, the party calls for an increase in the CO₂ price. At the end of the holistic transformation there should be a circular economy. The party emphasises the importance of social cohesion in the course of the transformation to climate neutrality.

Social policy 
Volt strives for a community of solidarity in which social mobility and participation in prosperity of all citizens is improved. To this end, destigmatized and appropriate social security systems that enable people to participate in society and plan their individual lives are to be created. The core issue in this context is the common good-oriented economy in order to counteract the social divide. According to Volt, the labour market is too bureaucratic, contains unclear legal regulations, sets the wrong incentives and lacks protection. The party, therefore, wants to create a new framework and improve employment relationships. Volt wants to reform the education system to a large extent and plans the "school of the future".

The party is against discrimination of any kind and calls for direct support for those affected, inclusion of people with disabilities and plans to combat racism and antisemitism. With a progressive migration policy the party wants to ensure that migration is organized in a humane way and that refugees are able to improve their opportunities for participation.

Volt calls for a progressive asylum and immigration policy that consistently implements the human right to asylum and finds transparent regulations for immigration. Volt wants the EU to evolve in this area and achieve a common asylum policy.

Economic and financial policy 
Volt judges the climate crisis and growing social inequalities to be the greatest dangers for the continent and Germany. Therefore, Volt combines green, liberal, and social elements in its economic policy. Its self-declared goal is an "ecologically-social and economically sustainable economy", a "sustainable and generation-appropriate market economy [...] that sees opportunities instead of obstacles in decarbonization, entrepreneurship, and digitalization." The party's economic policy is based on the principle of "sustainable development".

At the European level, the party wants to harmonize the EU's tax systems and reduce intra-European tax competition.

Volt demands the burden on small and medium incomes to be reduced. Bureaucracy must also be reduced and corporate tax rates lowered "towards a medium European level". In return, higher incomes should be taxed more heavily, as should profit from capital. Additionally, inheritance tax should be comprehensively reformed.

Digital policy 
In terms of digital policy, Volt advocates the nationwide expansion of broadband connections and has set itself the goal of consistently digitizing the administration along the lines of Estonia. To this end, Volt plans to establish a Ministry for Digital Affairs, to which the Federal Office for Information Security would be subordinated.

In Volt's view, states should use the technological possibilities of our time to update public services in areas such as education, health care, and the judiciary.

At the European level, Volt opposes the use of upload filters and instead advocates for a unified European copyright law. Volt also calls for a safe and precautionary approach to artificial intelligence, as well as ethical guidelines for AI research and use.

History 
In 2016, Andrea Venzon from Italy, Colombe Cahen-Salvador from France and Damian Boeselager from Germany were living and studying in the United States. Dismayed by the shift to the right and rising nationalism in Europe and the US, culminating in the Brexit referendum and Trump's election, among other things, they decided to found a European citizens' movement. On March 29, 2017, the day the UK declared Brexit Article 50, the non-profit association Vox Europa A.I.S.B.L. was founded in Luxembourg.

Due to several reasons, Vox Europa was already renamed Volt Europa on June 19, 2018. The new name, derived from the international unit for the measurement of electrical potential, is intended to describe the energy that Volt brings to the political landscape, on the one hand, and on the other hand, the word "Volt" is inclusive, as it is understood in all European languages.

Due to legal regulations, it was and is not possible to found a European party. In order to be able to participate in elections, Volt had to found national parties. In March 2018, the party Volt Germany was founded as the first national offshoot of Volt Europa. Today [as of 27.09.2021], Volt Europa is active in 29 countries, and officially registered as parties in 16 of them.

Volt Hamburg was the first national association of Volt Germany to be founded in late 2019. By April 2021, the founding of the other 15 state associations followed, so that Volt Germany is now organized nationwide in state associations.

Volt's first elections were the 2019 European elections. Due to different national registration requirements, Volt was able to participate in the elections in only eight member states. Volt contested with the same election programme, the Amsterdam Declaration, in all eight countries. In addition to noticeable successes, for example in the Netherlands (1,9%), and Luxembourg (2%) the party was able to gain 0.7% of the votes in Germany. As a result, the leading candidate Damian Boeselager entered the EU Parliament.

Volt views itself not only as a party, but also as a citizens' movement. Several initiatives, NGOs, etc. were founded, initiated or supported by Volt Europa and Volt Germany. These include the now independent aid organisation #EuropeCares, the initiative and petition #StopHomelessness, the initiative #ValuesOverPower, which campaigns against corruption and for the rule of law, as well as the European citizens' initiative EUrotrain.

In the federal election on 26 September 2021, Volt received 0,2 % of the first votes and 0,4 % of the second votes and thus did not win a mandate.

Political classification 
Party researcher Uwe Jun of the University of Trier assigns Volt to the left-liberal spectrum: "Above all conservative positions are missing." The party is described as "federal-European, progressive and social-liberal".

Prof. de Nève, a political scientist at the University of Giessen, attests that Volt appeals in particular to a younger and educated electorate to whom Europe is important. However, the party does not only want to appeal to a young, urban and educated clientele, but underpins its ambitions to reach as broad a spectrum of people as possible with its programs. With its pragmatic and evidence-based approach, Volt also appeals to people who are less concerned with arguing about ideologies and criticize the lack of effectiveness of politics in dealing with crises, according to Prof. Zittel of Goethe University in Frankfurt.

With its program and the focus on the topic of Europe, Volt is stepping into a political gap, according to Prof. Edgar Grande, a political scientist from Berlin. Up until now, Europe has been the subject of EU skeptics in particular. The rest of the program, too, is a "very serious attempt to draw up a catalog of values for a progressive movement in the 21st century."

Organisation 
The organizational structure of Volt Germany follows that of classical parties. Special features of the organisational structure can be traced back to the pan-European character, which results in a transnational participation and organisational structure, which comes into play especially in the formulation of political positions and programmes. The federal association is made up of the federal executive committee and a federal finance council. Both, the executive committee and a court of arbitration, and an auditor are elected at the federal party conference.

The party subdivides itself into state associations and for the first time contested in the 2021 federal election in all federal states with state lists.

Volt Europa 
Volt Germany is officially subordinate to the European parent organisation Volt Europa. Volt Europa consists of national organisations and parties from a total of 29 countries and entered the 2019 EU election with a unified election programme.

Party Executive Committee 
Volt Germany's federal executive committee, elected in 2019, currently consists of a dual leadership with Friederike Schier and Paul Loeper, four vice-chairpeople (Caroline Flohr, Sophie Griesbacher, Paulo Alexandre, Konstantin Feist) and treasurer Leo Lüddecke.
At the December Party Congress 2021, Rebekka Müller and Connor Geiger were elected as the new designated chairpeople with four vice-chairpeople (Carina Beckmann, Jennifer Scharpenberg, Maximilian Ochs, Jens Többen). Likewise, the re-election of the incumbent treasurer Leo Lüdecke took place.

Members 
Volt Germany's party members are often "younger and middle-aged, well-educated [as well as] internationally connected", with most members (~70%) not having been politically active before joining Volt Germany. The party says it currently has around 3,000 members in Germany.

Finances 
Volt's accounts for 2018 show income of around 53,056 euros. This consisted of 16.5% from membership fees, 60% from donations from natural persons, 11.3% from legal entities as well as 12.2% from events, distribution of printed material and publications and other income-related activity. There was no donation that exceeded 4,000 euros.

In 2019, the statement of accounts shows income of around 584,830 euros. 14,1 % of this came from membership fees, 62,2 % from donations from individuals, 7,1 % from legal entities and 7,3 % from income from events, distribution of printed matter and publications and other income-related activities. In addition, for the first time, there is income from state funds, which accounts for 8,9%. In total, the party received 5 donations over 10.000 euros in 2019, including for the first time a major donation from the entrepreneur Christian Burchard Max Oldendorff for 95.000 euros. This was the first time the party appeared in the statistics for major donors.

In 2020, according to the statement of accounts, membership fees accounted for 21,5 %. 30,9 % were donations from individuals, 3 % from legal entities, 0,7 % from contributions from elected representatives, 0,6 % from income from events, distribution of printed material and publications and other income-related activities. 43% of the income came from state funds. In total, the party's income amounted to around 877.133 euros.

Donations 
In accordance with its donation and transparency guidelines, Volt Germany publishes all donations over 3.000 euros, as a single donation or in the form of several donations added up over the year, on its website within 15 working days. So far (as of 25 January 2022), there have been 43 such donations over 3.000 euros in the party's history.

Regional associations 
Volt Germany is organized nationwide in numerous local teams which, with the exception of a few spun-off district associations, do not form legally independent organizational units. The local teams are assigned to the respective state association.

Electoral results

2019 European Parliament election
The 2019 European Parliament election in Germany was the first election in which Volt took part. The party obtained 0,7% of all votes in Germany and won one seat in the European Parliament.

2021 German federal election
In the 2021 German federal election Volt Germany reached 0.4% in the second votes. Due to a threshold of 5% Volt Germany is not represented in the Bundestag.

Result timeline

Prominent members 

 Damian Boeselager (MEP since 2019)
 Reinier van Lanschot (CO-President Volt Europa since 2019)

External links 

 Volt Deutschland Website
 Federal election 2021: Volt Germany, Federal Agency for Civic Education

References 

Liberal parties in Germany
Pro-European political parties in Germany
Social liberal parties
Political parties established in 2018
2018 establishments in Germany
Germany